Surasawadee Boonyuen (born October 31, 1991 in Udonthani) is a Thai indoor volleyball player. She is a member of the Thailand women's national volleyball team. She placed in fifth place in the 2008 Asian Junior Championship.

Clubs
  Nakhonnonthaburi (2009–2012)
  Kathu Phuket (2012–2013)
  Ayutthaya A.T.C.C (2013–2015)
  Idea Khonkaen (2015–present)

Awards

Clubs
 2011–12 Thailand League -  Champion, with Nakornnontthaburi
 2013 Thai–Denmark Super League -  Bronze medal, with Ayutthaya A.T.C.C
 2013–14 Thailand League -  Bronze medal, with Ayutthaya A.T.C.C
 2014 Thai–Denmark Super League -  Champion. with Ayutthaya A.T.C.C
 2016 Thai–Denmark Super League -  Bronze medal, with Idea Khonkaen
 2019 Thai–Denmark Super League -  Third, with Khonkaen Star
 2020 Thailand League –  Runner-up, with Khonkaen Star

References

External links
 FIVB Biography

1991 births
Living people
Surasawadee Boonyuen
Surasawadee Boonyuen
Surasawadee Boonyuen
Surasawadee Boonyuen